Marco Antonio Tomati or Marc'Antonio Tomati (unknown – 7 January 1693) was a Roman Catholic prelate who served as Bishop of Asti.

Biography
Marco Antonio Tomati was born in Caravonica, Italy on 5 January 1583.
On 11 January 1666, he was appointed during the papacy of Pope Alexander VII as Bishop of Asti.
He served as Bishop of Asti until his death on 7 January 1693.

References

External links and additional sources
 (for Chronology of Bishops) 
 (for Chronology of Bishops) 

17th-century Italian Roman Catholic bishops
Bishops appointed by Pope Alexander VII
1693 deaths